Congrosoma evermanni, or the Evermann's conger, is a species of eel in the family Congridae. It is the only member of its genus. It is only found in the Pacific Ocean off the west coast of Panama at a depth of 333 meters.

References

Congridae
Monotypic fish genera
Fish described in 1899